"Superman/Supergirl" is the fourth and final single from Australian band Killing Heidi's debut album Reflector. Its B-side is the album track "Black Sheep".

Track listing
CD single
 "Superman/Supergirl"
 "Black Sheep"
 "Live Without It"
 "Superman/Supergirl" (Music video)

Charts

References

2000 songs
Killing Heidi songs
Songs written by Ella Hooper
Songs written by Jesse Hooper
2000 singles
Warner Records singles